In enzymology, a N-acylneuraminate cytidylyltransferase is an enzyme that catalyzes the chemical reaction

CTP + N-acylneuraminate  diphosphate + CMP-N-acylneuraminate

Thus, the two substrates of this enzyme are CTP and N-acylneuraminate, whereas its two products are diphosphate and CMP-N-acylneuraminate.

This enzyme belongs to the family of transferases, specifically those transferring phosphorus-containing nucleotide groups (nucleotidyltransferases).  The systematic name of this enzyme class is CTP:N-acylneuraminate cytidylyltransferase. Other names in common use include CMP-sialate pyrophosphorylase, CMP-sialate synthase, cytidine 5'-monophosphosialic acid synthetase, CMP-Neu5Ac synthetase, CMP-NeuAc synthetase, acylneuraminate cytidyltransferase, CMP-N-acetylneuraminate synthetase, CMP-N-acetylneuraminate synthase, CMP-N-acetylneuraminic acid synthase, CMP-NANA synthetase, CMP-sialate synthetase, CMP-sialic synthetase, cytidine 5'-monophospho-N-acetylneuraminic acid synthetase, cytidine 5-monophosphate N-acetylneuraminic acid synthetase, cytidine monophosphosialic acid synthetase, cytidine monophosphoacetylneuraminic synthetase, cytidine monophosphosialate pyrophosphorylase, cytidine monophosphosialate synthetase, and acetylneuraminate cytidylyltransferase.  This enzyme participates in aminosugars metabolism.

Structural studies

References

 

EC 2.7.7
Enzymes of known structure